John Colvin may refer to:

John Russell Colvin (1807–1857), former lieutenant governor of India
John O. Colvin (born 1946), U.S. Tax Court judge
John Colvin (diplomat) (1922–2003), British Ambassador - Outer Mongolia
John Colvin (politician), South Dakota legislator (1895–1898) and Speaker of the South Dakota House of Representatives (1897–1898)
Jack Colvin, American character actor
John Colvin (engineer)